Sudbrook may refer to:
Sudbrook, Lincolnshire, England
Sudbrook, Monmouthshire, Wales
Sudbrook Park, Pikesville, Maryland, U.S.A.
Sudbrook Park and Sudbrook House, Petersham, England
Sudbrook (stream), London

See also
Sudbrooke, Lincolnshire